Oceana is the seventh studio album by keyboardist Derek Sherinian, released on September 5, 2011 through Music Theories Recordings. After his recording sessions for the album, guitarist Joe Bonamassa posted on his official forum: "This session was one of the most challenging of my career. To be in the studio with Derek Sherinian and Simon Phillips [is] daunting. A huge thanks to both Derek and Simon for getting me through it. I learned a lot. Oceana is a killer record. Highly recommended."

Track listing

Personnel
Derek Sherinian – keyboard, engineering, production, executive production
Tony MacAlpine – guitar (tracks 1, 2)
Steve Lukather – guitar (tracks 3, 4, 8)
Steve Stevens – guitar (tracks 5, 9)
Doug Aldrich – guitar (track 6)
Joe Bonamassa – guitar (track 7)
Simon Phillips – drums, engineering, mixing, production
Jimmy Johnson – bass (except tracks 5, 9)
Tony Franklin – bass (tracks 5, 9)
Alex Todorov – engineering
Brad Vance – mastering

References

Derek Sherinian albums
2011 albums